"True Scotsman" is a humorous term used in Scotland for a man wearing a kilt without undergarments. Though the tradition originated in the military, it has entered Scottish lore as a rite, an expression of light-hearted curiosity about the custom, and even as a subversive gesture.

However, in 2010, the Director of the Scottish Tartans Authority, Brian Wilton, described the tradition of not wearing undergarments as "childish and unhygienic". In response, racing driver David Coulthard and some kilt manufacturers spoke in favour of the tradition, while MSP Jamie McGrigor and Wimbledon champion Andy Murray admitted to wearing underpants under their kilts.

History
The earliest forms of the kilt, called a plaid or "great kilt" (feileadh mòr), were worn over the existing garments of the time, such as trews or breeches with hose or leg wraps.  From the late 1600s onward, historical paintings start to show some kilts worn with high socks, with no covering on the visible part of the upper legs.

It is unknown exactly why the practice of wearing no undergarments under the kilt began.  Despite numerous stories or claims that have been widely circulated, documented evidence is extremely scarce.  The earliest known reference to the practice is a series of satirical French illustrations in 1815 when Paris was occupied after the Battle of Waterloo.  Even so, it is unknown if the practice was a dress code requirement, was left to individual soldier's preference, or merely a false rumor that later evolved into an actual practice.  The kilt continued to be part of some regimental combat uniforms on the Western Front during the First World War: Every day the regiment would be inspected by a senior officer who would have a mirror to look under kilts. Anyone found wearing underpants would be sent back to take them off. However, in 1940 the kilt was retired from combat because of the vulnerability of bare skin to chemical agents, although it was retained as the formal dress uniform of the regiments.  The practice of not wearing undergarments led to an incident in 1997, when windy conditions during a military ceremony in Hong Kong caused a Black Watch soldier to be exposed in front of the press.

21st century
, Highland dancers and athletes have been bound by the nature of their competitions to appropriately and modestly clothe themselves. In Highland Dance competitions and exhibitions, the regulations of the Scottish Official Board of Highland Dancing (SOBHD) have stated regarding underwear: "Dark or toning with the kilt should be worn, but not white."

In 2015, the Scottish barmen of Hootananny pub in Inverness abandoned kilts because customers sexually harassed them by lifting their kilts repeatedly. Ian Howie, the pub's assistant manager, said: "You get large groups of drinking women circling around when you are collecting glasses and asking whether you are true Scotsman – and they find out for themselves. Mainly hen nights." The traditional Scottish garment was initially chosen to give the venue a more authentic feel. Now Tartan shorts will be worn instead.

In popular culture
Non-Scots and those unfamiliar with kilts seeking to determine the truth of the true Scotsman tradition can leave themselves open to innuendo and double entendre, as innocent queries can be turned on the questioner; as with the question "Is there anything worn under the kilt?" being answered with examples such as "No, nothing is worn, everything is in perfect working order!" or "Yes, socks, shoes, and talcum powder," and "Yes, socks, shoes, and two shades of lipstick."  Humorous "Kilt Inspector" and "Official Kilt Inspector" T-shirts can be purchased in Scottish tourist shops and online.
In the film On Her Majesty's Secret Service, James Bond removes his kilt to seduce Ruby Bartlett.  As it falls to the floor, she laughs and cries out, "It's true!"
In the 1995 film Braveheart, during the Battle of Stirling Bridge scene, the Scottish soldiers lift their kilts to flash the English archers, taunting them after an attack.
The plot of the sixteenth Carry On... film, Carry On Up the Khyber, revolves around the mishaps of a fictional Scottish regiment following the discovery that one of them, Private Widdle, is not a true Scotsman.
In the Monty Python's Flying Circus sketch, "Ideal Loon Exhibition", one of the more popular attractions at the exhibition is the "Scotsman With Nae Trews Exhibit, Sponsored by Natural Gas". It features John Cleese, in full Highlander garb, standing solemnly on a pedestal whilst a line of old ladies come up one by one and take a look under his kilt.
In the film Wrongfully Accused, Leslie Nielsen at one point dresses in a kilt to infiltrate a Pipe Band. He steps over a sewer grate blowing air a la Marilyn Monroe in the film Seven Year Itch, and noise similar to air being blown over an open bottle is heard.
In the 1949 film, The Hasty Heart, Yank, played by Ronald Reagan, refuses to believe that nothing is worn under a kilt and during the film, there are several times where the soldiers try to look under the kilt of Richard Todd's character.  In the end, someone looks under his kilt and everyone starts laughing, as presumably Todd was indeed wearing nothing.
In The Simpsons episode "Children of a Lesser Clod", when playing basketball at the Springfield YMCA, Groundskeeper Willie completes a lay-up when the other men recoil at the sight of his exposed privates from running in a kilt, In the episode "Who Shot Mr. Burns?", Groundskeeper Willie does a parody of the Basic Instinct cross-legging scene, where Chief Wiggum, Lou and Eddie recoil after Willie uncrosses his legs and crosses them again. Eddie then points a gun at him and tells him that was his last warning. In the episode "Whacking Day", Willie insults Principal Skinner as a "bath-taking, underpants-wearing lily hugger" under his breath as Skinner forces Willie to take part in the plan of trapping the school troublemakers in the basement while Superintendent Chalmers inspects the school.
An advertisement for Lawson's Scotch Whisky shows a Scottish rugby team dressed in kilts and naked above the waist, standing impassive as a Maori rugby team perform the haka, and then respond by silently raising the front of their kilts causing visible intimidation in their foes.
In the Greg Davies comedy show, Man Down, Stephanie Cole's female character Nesta arrives in the room wearing a kilt and Dan (Greg Davies) asks "please tell me you're wearing underwear!", to which Nesta replies "I am of Scottish heritage and proud!", she then lifts her kilt up and Dan recoils and yells "I'm blind!, she's blinded me!"
The song "The Scotsman", popularized in 1980 by Bryan Bowers through airplay on the Dr. Demento radio show, finds a pair of young ladies encountering a true Scotsman.
A scene in the film Brave shows the various Scottish clan leaders climbing down from the castle after a futile chase: they are shown nude from the rear, having used their kilts to make a climbing rope. An earlier scene in the film has one of the lords, Lord Dingwall, mooning his companions by lifting up the rear of his kilt.
In the 1927 film Putting Pants on Philip, Stan Laurel, as a young Scotsman new to the United States, suffers mishaps involving his kilt. He walks over a ventilation grating a couple of times and his kilt is blown up displaying his tartan boxer shorts. Later, after Philip loses his shorts, he again walks over a ventilation grating and the crowd sees more than his boxers, causing a number of ladies to faint instantly.

See also

Going commando

References 

Scottish culture
Military traditions
Undergarments